"Undeniable" is the second single from Mat Kearney's second album, Nothing Left to Lose.

Charts

Weekly charts

Year-end charts

Media
This song has been featured on Cold Case.

References

2007 singles
2007 songs